Etsuko (written: 悦子, 英津子, えつ子, えつこ in hiragana or エツコ in katakana) is a feminine Japanese given name. The most common meaning is joy child. Notable people with the name include:

, Japanese football player
, Japanese classical pianist
, Japanese actress
, Japanese figure skater
, Japanese tennis player
, Japanese actress and voice actress
Etsuko Kamakura (1914-????), Japanese diver
, Japanese cricketer
, Japanese sprinter
, Japanese voice actress
, Japanese professional wrestler
, Japanese sprinter
, Japanese drummer
, Japanese novelist
, Japanese singer, actress and model
, Japanese actress
, Japanese professional boxer
, Japanese football player
, Japanese badminton player
, Japanese singer

See also
8691 Etsuko, a main-belt asteroid

Japanese feminine given names